The Women's Heptathlon at the 2005 World Championships in Athletics was held at the Helsinki Olympic Stadium on Saturday August 6 and Sunday August 7.

Medalists

Schedule

Saturday, August 6, 2005

Sunday, August 7, 2005

Records

Results

Overall results
Points table after 7th event

See also
2005 Hypo-Meeting

References
 IAAF results: 100 m hurdles, high jump, shot put, 200 m, long jump, javelin, 800 m
IAAF results: Final standings

Heptathlon
Heptathlon at the World Athletics Championships
2005 in women's athletics